Sunset is a suburb of Mount Isa in the City of Mount Isa, Queensland, Australia.

Geography 
The Leichhard River flows north-south through the town of Mount Isa, dividing the suburbs of the town into "mineside" (west of the Leichhardt River) and "townside" (east of the Leichhardt River). Sunset is a "townside" suburb.

Sunset is bounded on the east by Sunset Drive and to the south by an unnamed creek (a tributary of the Leichhardt River). The western part of the suburb is mostly flat (approximately 360 metres above sea level) and is used for residential purposes. To the east of the suburban development, the land rises to two local prominences (420 metres above sea level).

History 
The suburb of Sunset is named because it is on the western side of a slope with views of the sunset.

Sunset State School opened on 30 January 1968.

Education 
Sunset State School is a government primary (Prep-6) school for boys and girls at Abel Smith Parade.  In 2016, the school had an enrolment of 253 students (of whom 195 identify as Indigenous) with 24 teachers (23 full-time equivalent) and 19 non-teaching staff (14 full-time equivalent). In 2018, the school had an enrolment of 252 students with 25 teachers (24 full-time equivalent) and 12 non-teaching staff (9 full-time equivalent). It includes a special education program.

Mount Isa Flexible Learning Centre is a Catholic secondary (7-12) school for boys and girls at 74 Abel Smith Parade. The school provides individual support for students unsuited to mainstream schooling to improve their education and assist them in gaining employment. In 2018, the school had an enrolment of 42 students with 5 teachers (4 full-time equivalent) and 12 non-teaching staff (7 full-time equivalent).

There is no mainstream secondary school in Sunset. The nearest government secondary school is Spinifex State College which has its junior campus in Parkside to the south-west and its senior campus in neighbouring Pioneer to the south.

Amenities 
There are a number of parks in the area:

 Bill Macdonald Park
 Charlie Steene Park

 Sunset Park

 Sunset Stadium

References

External links 

 

City of Mount Isa